Lakos is a surname. Notable people with the surname include:

André Lakos (born 1979), Austrian ice hockey defenceman
Gyöngyvér Lakos (born 1977), Hungarian freestyle swimmer
László Lakos (born 1945), Hungarian veterinarian and former politician
Nikoletta Lakos (born 1978), Hungarian chess woman grandmaster
Philippe Lakos (born 1980), Austrian ice hockey defenceman

See also
Dolnji Lakoš, is a village southwest of Lendava in the Prekmurje region of Slovenia
Gornji Lakoš, is a village southwest of Lendava in the Prekmurje region of Slovenia

References